The Rio Grande City – Camargo International Bridge is an international bridge along the United States–Mexico border between the U.S. state of Texas and the Mexican state of Tamaulipas. It is a crossing of the Rio Grande that connects the cities of Rio Grande City, Texas and Camargo, Tamaulipas. The bridge is also known as the Starr – Camargo Bridge and, in Spanish, Puente Camargo.

Description
The bridge is owned and managed by the Starr Camargo Bridge Company based in Rio Grande City.

On the U.S. side, the crossing connects with Pete Diaz Avenue and Bridge Avenue, which provides access to U.S. Route 83. On the Mexican side the bridge connects with Carr Al Puente Internacional to Ciudad Camargo.

The bridge is used by car but also truck traffic (load restriction to ).

Border crossing

The Rio Grande City Port of Entry is located at the Rio Grande City – Camargo International Bridge.

For much of the 20th century, a small ferry operation connected the cities of Camargo and Rio Grande City. Finally in 1966, a bridge was built by the Starr Camargo Bridge Company. and a new border inspection station was built at that time.  The station was upgraded in 2000.

References

International bridges in Tamaulipas
International bridges in Texas
Road bridges in Texas
Toll bridges in Mexico
Toll bridges in Texas
Lower Rio Grande Valley
Bridges completed in 1966
Buildings and structures in Starr County, Texas
Transportation in Starr County, Texas
Steel bridges in the United States
Steel bridges
Girder bridges in the United States
Girder bridges